MAP kinase-activated protein kinase 5 is an enzyme that in humans is encoded by the MAPKAPK5 gene.
The protein encoded by this gene is a member of the serine/threonine kinase family. In response to cellular stress and proinflammatory cytokines, this kinase is activated through its phosphorylation by MAP kinases, including MAPK1/ERK, MAPK14/p38-alpha, and MAPK11/p38-beta. In vitro, this kinase phosphorylates heat shock protein HSP27 at its physiologically relevant sites. Two alternately-spliced transcript variants of this gene encoding distinct isoforms have been reported.

A link between Alzheimer's disease and reduced levels of MAPKAPK5 has been proposed. Clinical trials may confirm if this is the case.

References

Further reading

EC 2.7.11